Kim Young-Ja (born 4 November 1949) is a South Korean former volleyball player who competed in the 1968 Summer Olympics and in the 1972 Summer Olympics.

References

1949 births
Living people
South Korean women's volleyball players
Olympic volleyball players of South Korea
Volleyball players at the 1968 Summer Olympics
Volleyball players at the 1972 Summer Olympics
Asian Games medalists in volleyball
Volleyball players at the 1970 Asian Games
Medalists at the 1970 Asian Games
Asian Games silver medalists for South Korea